Trichonyssodrys cinctus is a species of beetle in the family Cerambycidae. It was described by Delfino in 1981.

References

Acanthocinini
Beetles described in 1981